1954 in the Philippines details events of note that happened in the Philippines in 1954.

Incumbents

 President: Ramon Magsaysay (Nacionalista Party) 
 Vice President: Carlos P. Garcia (Nacionalista Party) 
 Chief Justice: Ricardo Paras 
 Congress: 3rd (starting January 25)

Events

May
 1 May–9 May – The Asian Games take place in Manila.

July
 July 21 – The Southeast Asia Collective Defense Treaty is signed in Manila, creating the South East Asian Treaty Organization (SEATO).
 July 24 – Blesilda Ocampo is placed Top 15 of Miss Universe 1954 at Long Beach, California, USA. She is the first Filipina finalist.

September
 September 2 – A timber train carrying more than 100 passengers derailed and multiple wagons fall off a bridge near Fabrica, Negros Occidental. At least 82 people were killed.

December
 December 15 – The Laurel-Langley Agreement is signed.

Holidays

As per Act No. 2711 section 29, issued on March 10, 1917, any legal holiday of fixed date falls on Sunday, the next succeeding day shall be observed as legal holiday. Sundays are also considered legal religious holidays. Bonifacio Day was added through Philippine Legislature Act No. 2946. It was signed by then-Governor General Francis Burton Harrison in 1921. On October 28, 1931, the Act No. 3827 was approved declaring the last Sunday of August as National Heroes Day.

 January 1 – New Year's Day
 February 22 – Legal Holiday
 April 15 – Maundy Thursday
 April 16 – Good Friday
 May 1 – Labor Day
 July 4 – Philippine Republic Day
 August 13  – Legal Holiday
 August 29  – National Heroes Day
 November 25 – Thanksgiving Day
 November 30 – Bonifacio Day
 December 25 – Christmas Day
 December 30 – Rizal Day

Sports
 May 8 – The Asian Football Confederation (AFC) is formed in Manila, Philippines.

Births

 January 14 – Ramon S. Ang, Filipino businessman
 January 15 – Jose Dalisay, Jr., Filipino writer

 February 21 – Carl Benito, politician

 March 6 – Chanda Romero, actress

 April 26 – Chito S. Roño, Filipino director
 April 28 – Vic Sotto, Filipino actor, television show host, comedian, and film producer
 April 29 – Josephine Sato, Filipino politician

 May 4:
 Rey Valera, Filipino singer
 Ryan Cayabyab, Filipino conductor, musician, and composer
 May 23 – Menardo Guevarra, lawyer, public servant, and Secretary of Justice
 May 25 – Emilia Boncodin, accountant, professor, and public servant (d. 2010)

 June 30 – Boy Logro, chef

 July 5:
 Datu Yusoph Boyog Mama, Filipino Diplomat
 Rolando Uy, Filipino politician
 July 13 – Florencio Abad, Filipino lawyer and politician.
 July 17 – Elizabeth Oropesa, Filipino actress
 July 28 – Bernie Fabiosa, Filipino professional basketball player and actor

 August 26 – Efren Reyes, OLD, PLH, Filipino professional pool player
 August 29 – Neptali Gonzales II, Filipino lawmaker

 September 8 – Edgar Mortiz, Filipino actor and director
 September 10 – Victoria Hernandez-Reyes, Filipino politician
 September 22:
 Rene Villanueva, Filipino author published in the Philippines (d. 2007)
 Michael Marcos Keon, Filipino politician.
 September 28 – Tata Esteban, Filipino producer-director. (d. 2003)

 October 12 – Wilfredo Caminero, Filipino politician
 October 18 – John F. Du, Catholic archbishop
 October 28 – Mike Rama, Filipino politician
 October 31 – Rey Aquino, Filipino politician

 November 1 – Susan Fuentes, Filipino singer (d. 2013)

 December 26 – Hajji Alejandro, Filipino singer and actor

Deaths
 June 27 - Alfredo Versoza, Filipino Catholic Church (b. 1877)

References